Władysław Grotyński (16 October 1945 – 28 June 2002) was a Polish footballer. He played in four matches for the Poland national football team from 1970 to 1971.

References

External links
 

1945 births
2002 deaths
Polish footballers
Poland international footballers
Association football goalkeepers
People from Włocławek County